"Ha" is a 1998 single by rapper Juvenile, from his third album 400 Degreez. It was produced by Mannie Fresh. This song, along with Juvenile's "Back That Azz Up" and B.G.'s "Bling Bling" was responsible for taking Cash Money Records from a small local label in New Orleans to the pop mainstream. The song is notable for its unique style of rapping, with every line except the chorus ending with "ha".  The chorus to the song interpolates a line taken from the earlier Juvenile single "Solja Rags".

Music video
The music video (directed by Marc Klasfeld was shot in September 1998 in the Magnolia Projects in New Orleans, Louisiana. It shows different highlights of ghetto life. B.G., The Big Tymers, Lil Wayne & Turk all appear in the video.

Charts
"Ha" peaked at number 16 on the Billboard Hot R&B/Hip-Hop Singles & Tracks chart and number 68 on the Billboard Hot 100.

Remixes

Two remixes were recorded and also included on 400 Degreez. The first had a different beat and lyrics, and featured Juvenile's fellow Hot Boys members B.G., Lil Wayne, and Turk. The second had the same beat but different lyrics and featured a new verse from New York rapper Jay-Z. The second remix was not planned until Jay Z himself personally contacted Baby and requested to be included on the remix. Jay-Z was the only guest on the album not signed to Cash Money Records. Rapper 50 Cent samples the song's lyrics on the song "Paper Chaser".

Charts

Weekly charts

Year-end charts

References

External links 

1999 singles
Juvenile (rapper) songs
Cash Money Records singles
Gangsta rap songs
Songs written by Juvenile (rapper)
Song recordings produced by Mannie Fresh
Music videos directed by Marc Klasfeld
1998 songs
Songs written by Mannie Fresh